Middle-earth is the fictional setting of some of J. R. R. Tolkien's fantasy writings.

Middle-earth may also refer to:
 Midgard, Old English middengeard, the world of mortals in Germanic mythology
 Middle-earth in film
 Middle-earth in video games
 Middle-earth Collectible Card Game, a card game based on the Tolkien setting
 Middle-earth Role Playing, a pen and paper roleplaying game based in Middle-earth and published by Iron Crown Enterprises
 Middle Earth Housing, a student housing complex at the University of California, Irvine
 Middle Earth (album), an album by Bob Catley
 Middle Earth (club), a countercultural club and music venue in London in the late 1960s
 Middle-earth: Shadow of Mordor, a 2014 video game inspired by Tolkien
 Middle-earth: Shadow of War, a 2017 video game inspired by Tolkien